Mauke Airport is an airport on Mauke in the Cook Islands .

Airlines and destinations

External links
Mauke and Mauke Airport Images

Airports in the Cook Islands
Mauke